Rock of Ages may refer to:

Films 
 Rock of Ages (1918 film), a British silent film by Bertram Phillips
 Rock of Ages (2012 film), a film adaptation of the jukebox musical (see below)

Music 
 Rock of Ages (musical), a 2006 rock jukebox musical
 Rock of Ages Festival, an annual music festival in Calistoga, California, U.S.

Hymns 
 "Rock of Ages" (Christian hymn), a 1763 hymn by the Reverend Augustus Montague Toplady
 "Rock of Ages" (Hanukkah hymn), a translation of the Jewish liturgical poem Ma'oz Tzur

Albums 
 Rock of Ages (The Band album), 1972
 Rock of Ages: The Definitive Collection, a 2005 album by Def Leppard
 Rock of Ages: The DVD Collection, a 2005 DVD by Def Leppard
 Rock of Ages... Hymns and Faith, a 2005 album by Amy Grant

Songs 
 "Rock of Ages" (Def Leppard song), a 1983 song by Def Leppard
 "Rock of Ages", a song by Gillian Welch from Hell Among the Yearlings
 "Rock of Ages", a song by Grant Lee Buffalo from Mighty Joe Moon
 "Rock of Ages", a song by Jobriath from Jobriath
 "The Rock of Ages", a song by Magnolia Electric Co. from Josephine

Places 
 Rock of Ages (Wyoming), a mountain in the Teton Range, Grand Teton National Park, Wyoming, USA
 Rock of Ages Light, a U.S. Coast Guard lighthouse near Isle Royale, Michigan
 The Rock of Ages, a cliff in Burrington Combe in Somerset, England

Other uses 
 Rock of Ages (video game), a 2011 action-strategy video game
Rock of Ages II: Bigger & Boulder, the 2017 sequel
 Rock of Ages III: Make & Break, the 2020 sequel
 Rock of Ages Corporation, a granite quarrying and finishing company in Graniteville, Vermont
 Rocks of Ages, a 1999 book by Stephen Jay Gould